Frederick William Whitbread (31 August 1892 – 1 January 1939) was a British boxer. He fought under the name Freddie Whitbread He competed in the men's welterweight event at the 1920 Summer Olympics.

Whitbread won the 1920 Amateur Boxing Association British welterweight title, when boxing out of the Fulham ABC.

References

External links
 

1892 births
1939 deaths
British male boxers
Olympic boxers of Great Britain
Boxers at the 1920 Summer Olympics
Place of birth missing
Welterweight boxers